Iowa County Airport  is a county-owned public-use airport located three nautical miles (6 km) northwest of the central business district of Mineral Point, a city in Iowa County, Wisconsin, United States. It is included in the Federal Aviation Administration (FAA) National Plan of Integrated Airport Systems for 2021–2025, in which it is categorized as a local general aviation facility.

Although many U.S. airports use the same three-letter location identifier for the FAA and IATA, this facility is assigned MRJ by the FAA but has no designation from the IATA (which assigned MRJ to Marcala Airport in Marcala, Honduras).

Facilities and aircraft 
Iowa County Airport covers an area of 383 acres (155 ha) at an elevation of 1,170 feet (357 m) above mean sea level. It has two runways with asphalt surfaces: 11/29 is 5,001 by 75 feet (1,524 x 23 m) and 4/22 is 3,600 by 60 feet (1,097 x 18 m).

For the 12-month period ending April 22, 2021, the airport had 6,750 aircraft operations, an average of 18 per day: 82% general aviation, 11% air taxi and 7% military. In January 2023, there were 30 aircraft based at this airport: 24 single-engine, 4 multi-engine and 2 helicopter.

Cargo operations

See also 
 List of airports in Wisconsin

References

External links 
 Airport page at Iowa County website
  at Wisconsin DOT Airport Directory
 

Airports in Wisconsin
Buildings and structures in Iowa County, Wisconsin